Cisthene metoxia is a moth of the family Erebidae. It was described by George Hampson in 1898. It is found on St. Vincent and Grenada.

References

Cisthenina
Moths described in 1898